The European Centre for Electoral Support (ECES) is a not for profit, private, non partisan and independent Foundation with its Headquarters in the capital of Belgium, Brussels.

It was established at the end of 2010 via the initiative of Fabio Bargiacchi with Abbot Apollinaire Muholongu Malu Malu and of some other senior electoral and democracy support practitioners co-opted to serve the European Union and its Member states in their electoral cooperation matters with their respective partner countries.

ECES operates globally, however, it has implemented projects and activities mainly in Africa and the Middle East, primarily with funding from the European Union and several EU Member states among which are Germany, France, Italy, Denmark, Ireland, Austria and Luxembourg.

Together with the United Nations Development Programme, International IDEA and the Organisation for the Security and Cooperation in Europe, ECES is today among the 4 most important implementing partners of electoral support funded by the European Union and its Member States at global level.

ECES is TRACE and ISO 9001 certified for its financial and quality management systems respectively.

ECES is a member of the European Peacebuilding Liaison Office network,  the largest European network of 40 independent organisations from around 20 European countries working in the area of peacebuilding and conflict prevention.

History 
ECES was ideated by Fabio Bargiacchi, a Senior Electoral Expert with an extensive specific comparative experience, having served in various capacities within global development institutions, in the field of electoral assistance and election observation, including the European Union and the United Nations Development Programme. During his career and until 2010, he coordinated the "EC-UNDP Joint Task Force for the implementation of the partnership between the European Commission and UNDP on electoral assistance. Drawing from his experiences, together with Abbot Apollinaire Muholongu Malu Malu, they co-opted other electoral and democracy practitioners (including Monica Frassoni and others) to lead a process that birthed ECES.

Malu Malu served as the first President of ECES, from September 2010 until June 2013 when he was re-appointed Chairperson of the Independent Electoral Commission of the Democratic Republic of Congo before his demise in 2016. From July 2013 till date, Monica Frassoni stepped in and is still serving as ECES' President, while Fabio Bargiacchi, serves as Member of the Management Board and Executive Director, since its establishment.

ECES commenced the implementation of relevant activities funded by the European Space Agency at the beginning of 2012, which included electoral coaching and learning activities delivered through a face-to-face and distance learning training for the 10 Electoral Management Bodies of the Economic Community of Central African States. Right after, a project in support of the elections in Libya in 2012 was implemented with the funding of the EU. Since then, ECES has implemented activities in more than 50 countries with funding mainly from the European Union and its Member States.  

Since September 2020, ECES established a Strategic and Advisory Committee. This committee is led by its President, Joëlle Milquet, former Belgian Deputy Prime Minister and Vice-president, Filiberto Ceriani Sebregondi, former senior EU executive as well as former EU Ambassador in Togo, Tanzania and Ghana. Members of the Committee include:

 Piero Scarpellini, Executive Adviser to the former President of Italian Ministers’ Council Romano Prodi  in charge of relations with Member states of the African Union,   
 Elena Valenciano former member of the European Parliament,   
 Erastus J.O. Mwencha former Vice Chairman of the African Union,   
 Samar Haj Hassan, former member of the Independent Electoral Commission of Jordan and   
 Didier de Jaeger also President of the Board of Altavia.

Strategy 

ECES implements activities via its specific and copyrighted approach called "European Response to the Electoral Cycle Support, EURECS". This tailored approach targets the delivery of electoral and democracy assistance activities, in consistency primarily with European values and EU policies. EURECS is implemented through methodologies and tools also copyrighted by ECES and namely the:

 Peace Mediation on Electoral Processes
 Electoral Political Economy Analyses,
 Electoral Security Threat Assessment, 
Peace Mediation on Electoral Processes 
 Project approach to contribute Preventing Electoral Violence and Conflicts, 
 Cascade training curricula called ”Leadership and Conflict Management Skills for Electoral Stakeholders, LEAD” and "Leadership and Quality Management Skills for Electoral Administrator, LEAD Q”,
 Electoral Translator Application, 
 Innov-Elections approach to distance coaching and capacity development on electoral matters,
 Standard Operating Procedures for the implementation of EURECS,
 Communication & Visibility Guidelines.

Key Activities 
 Electoral Advisory on every aspects of the electoral cycle
Management of Basket Funds for the implementation of electoral support
Political Dialogue over electoral matters
Electoral Crisis mediation/process
Confidence building/dialogue initiatives
Support to religious networks, inter and intra faith dialogue
 Logistics and operational support
 Media monitoring and institutional communication
 Implementation of civic-voter education campaigns
 Hybrid approach to capacity development delivery through a flexible menu of distance training curricula,
 Procurement of electoral material:
 Development of innovative information and communication technologies (ICTs) solutions and applications 
Design and securitisation of ballot papers 
 Transmission of election results
 Production of visibility plan

Main Projects 

PRO Electoral Integrity via the African Union
Electoral Support in Chad
Pro Observation Mali
Innov-Elections 
Prevent, Mitigate and Manage Election-Related Conflict and Potential Violence in Ethiopia - PEV-Ethiopia
European Response to Electoral Cycle Support in Ethiopia - EURECS Ethiopia 
EU Support to Democratic Governance in Nigeria -EU-SDGN
EU Support to Jordanian Democratic Institutions and Development - EU-JDID
Project in Support of Enhanced Sustainability and Electoral Integrity in Afghanistan - PROSES
European Resources for Mediation Support - ERMES
Election Observation and Democracy Support - EODS
Prevent, Mitigate and Manage Election-Related Conflict and Potential Violence in South Africa - PEV-RSA
Prevention and Management of Conflicts and Potential Violence related to Elections in Madagascar - PEV-Madagascar
Prevention and Management of Conflicts and Potential Violence related to Elections in the SADC countries - PEV SADC
Projet en Appui a la Crédibilité et Transparence en Burkina Faso - PACTE Burkina Faso
Projet en Appui a la Crédibilité et Transparence en Guinee - PACTE Guinee
Supporting Democracy in Libya - SUDEL
Projet en Appui a la Crédibilité et Transparence aux iles Comores - PACTE Comores
Project in support of a Peaceful and Inclusive Electoral Process in Zanzibar - PROPEL Zanzibar
Initiative Citoyenne pour la Consolidation de la Paix, Leadership et Stabilité - INCIPALS Madagascar
Projet d'Appui au Dialogue Démocratique au Gabon
Support to Civil Society, Local Authorities and Human Rights in Ukraine
Project in Support of the Electoral Process in Senegal - PAPE Senegal
Support to the capacity development of the electoral commission in Sudan - SDP Sudan
A Political Safari in Ghana, Madagascar, Conakry and Zanzibar using the movie "An African Elections"

Funding 
ECES cooperates with several donor organisations to fund its activities, the most important of which are: the European Union, EU Member States such as Germany, France, Italy, Denmark, Austria, Luxembourg and Ireland. The EU funds have come from different financial instruments, including:

European Development Fund - EDF
European Neighbourhood Instrument - NEAR
European Initiative to support Democracy and Human Rights - EIDHR
Development Cooperation Instrument - DCI

In total ECES has received funds from more than 25 donors since 2010, including limited contributions from USAID, AUSaid and Canada.

Collaborations and Awards 

ECES collaborates with global, regional organisations and electoral networks, such as the:

 African Union, 
 ECOWAS,  
 RECEF (the Electoral Knowledge Network of the French Speaking countries worldwide), 
 Indian Ocean Commission, 
 ECF-SADC (Electoral Commission Forum of the Southern African Development Community), 
 ECONEC (Network of Electoral Commissions of the Economic Community of West African States), 
 Electoral Knowledge Network of the Central African States (RESEAC),
 SADC Electoral Support Network that comprises the platforms of the Civil Society Organisations dealing with Election Observation in the SADC countries.
A-WEB Association of World Election Bodies 
Organization of American States

ECES also partners with the Sant’Anna School of Advanced Studies of Pisa and the United Nations Institute for Training and Research through the delivery of the online "Master on Electoral Policy and Administration – MEPA".
 
ECES is part of a consortium led by the College of Europe to implement the ERMES project (European Response on Mediation Support) which provides a tool for the EU to advance its objectives and role in the field of mediation and dialogue. 
 
ECES is a member of the Federation of European and International Association established in Belgium (FAIB) and is part of the EU Transparency Register and the Transnational Giving Europe Network.

In 2018, ECES was invited at pre-workshop of the American Association of Political Science (APSA) titled “New Challenges in Electoral Management, Building Better Elections”. The workshop was organised in Boston at the Massachusetts Institute of Technology (MIT) by the Electoral Management Network, the Electoral Integrity Project and the MIT Election Data and Science Lab. ECES' presentation focused on the topic “Mitigating Electoral Violence”. On the occasion of its Preventing and Mitigating Electoral Violence in the Southern Africa Development Community which was funded by the European Union, ECES launched the handbook “Preventing and mitigating electoral conflict and violence: lessons from the Southern Africa” .

In November 2020, at the Paris Peace Forum, ECES was selected as one of the best 10 projects among over 850 projects for its "European Response to Electoral Cycle Support" approach also implemented in Ethiopia with an angle to prevent and mitigate electoral conflicts and violence. With this selection, ECES received a 12-month customised support from the Paris Peace Forum, through monthly workshops and targeted advice from two senior mentors (Stefano Manservisi and Jean Marie Guéhenno).

In May 2021, Bankole Adeoye, the new Commissioner for Political Affairs and Peace and Security of the African Union, signed with the Executive Director of ECES a Memorandum of Understanding (MoU) for the collaboration in the areas of Electoral Integrity, Prevention of Electoral Conflicts, Human Rights and Women Political Participation.

Publications 
ECES via its members or other Experts working for the foundation have authored, co-authored or contributed to specialised publications in the field of electoral and democracy support such as: 
Strategic Planning using Quality Management Principle
Media Monitoring, Hate Speech and Gender based violence
SDG 16: An enabler for accelerated implementation of the 2030 Agenda 
Challenges and Opportunities of Implementing E-Voting in Nigeria: the cases of Indonesia, Brasil, India and Namibia (2021)
Innov-Elections - Delivering Electoral and Democracy Support under COVID-19: ECES Preparedness and Responses (2020)
 Reflections on Election Conflict and Violence Prevention: Lessons from Southern Africa (2018)
 Preventing and Mitigating Electoral Conflict and Violence - Handbook (2018)
 The potential of EU Funded electoral assistance to support the prevention of election related conflict and violence: Lessons from the Southern African Region  (2017)
 A European Response to Electoral Cycle Approach - EURECS (2016)
 Using International Standards. Council of Europe Handbook for Domestic Election Observers (2013)
 Biometrics in Elections: Issues and Perspectives, European Centre for Electoral Support, Organisation Internationale de la Francophonie (OIF) and National Autonomous and Permanent Electoral Commission of Gabon (2013)
 Missing a Trick? Building Bridges between EU Mediation and EU Electoral Support in Conflict-affected Countries, Antje Herrberg, Fabio Bargiacchi and Raphaël Pouyé, MediatEUr (2012)
 Essential Consideration of Electronic Voting published by International IDEA (2011)
 ISPI Working Paper on the Electoral Cycle Approach: Effectiveness and Sustainability of Electoral Assistance (2011)
 EU and Peace building, Policy and Legal Aspects: EU Electoral Support (2010)
 EC-UNDP Operational Paper on Procurement Aspects of Introducing ICTs in Electoral Processes: the specific case of biometric voter registration (2010)
 EC-UNDP Operational Guidelines. Implementation of Electoral Assistance Programmes and Projects (2006 and 2008)
 ACE Focus on Effective Electoral Assistance (2007)
 UNDP Electoral Assistance Implementation Guide (2007)
 EC Methodological Guide on Electoral Assistance (2006)

References 

 https://www.t20italy.org/2021/09/21/an-enabler-for-accelerated-implementation-of-the-2030-agenda-amid-covid-19/https://www.youtube.com/watch?v=1zYSUdHavfY
https://event.changenow.world/en/session/2aff9988-a9b1-eb11-94b3-000d3a219024
https://parispeaceforum.org/le-programme/projets-despoir-lexpansion-de-la-sphere-publique-dans-la-pratique/
https://www.g20-insights.org/authors/fabio-bargiacchi/
https://podcasts.apple.com/es/podcast/votes-ballots/id1553612057
 https://theconversation.com/le-forum-de-paris-sur-la-paix-nouvel-outil-du-multilateralisme-ou-instrument-du-soft-power-francais-157654
 https://themorningherald.com/news/france-tackles-global-issues-strengthens-multilateral-cooperation-through-paris-peace-forum-the-davos-of-global-governance-issues/0297606
 https://parismatch.be/actualites/politique/474819/epreuves-trahisons-bonheur-nouveau-joelle-milquet-brise-le-silence-pour-paris-match
 https://www.huffingtonpost.it/entry/la-democrazia-ai-tempi-del-covid-19_it_5f607389c5b6e27db1322f2c
 https://www.lalibre.be/debats/opinions/quand-le-covid-met-les-democraties-en-danger-5f5f889c9978e2322ffc1def
 https://www.farodiroma.it/partenariato-con-lafrica-la-nuova-strategia-dellitalia/
 https://www.rtbf.be/info/belgique/detail_joelle-milquet-a-la-tete-du-comite-strategique-du-centre-europeen-d-appui-electoral?id=10650700
 https://web.archive.org/web/20161214153912/https://eudevdays.eu/sessions/european-response-electoral-cycle-support
 http://www.leadingeffectively.com/leadership-explorer/ccl-collaborates-with-the-european-center-for-electoral-support/
 http://www.aceeeo.org/hu/node/191
 https://web.archive.org/web/20161110235719/http://www.diplocat.cat/en/activities/training/election-observation-training
 https://sites.google.com/site/electoralintegrityproject4/links2
 https://web.archive.org/web/20161214153925/http://wagner-hatfield.com/index.php/2015/12/12/strengthening-the-electoral-process-in-the-comoros/
 https://web.archive.org/web/20161214153927/http://www.themediateur.eu/news/item/314-barcelona_training
 https://web.archive.org/web/20161220132145/http://www.bridge-project.org/en/news2/africa/1466-electoral-administration-workshop-in-mozambique.html
 http://www.ispionline.it/it/ispi-school/course-typologies/advanced-diploma/ad-electoral-assistance
 https://www.electoralnetwork.org/index.php/user/members
 http://phys.org/news/2014-06-satellites-rural-africa.html
 https://web.archive.org/web/20161214153943/http://www.leadbeyond.org/dealing-with-election-related-violence-training-course-in-leadership-conflict-management-and-mediation-skills-for-electoral-stakeholders/
 http://www.collateralcreations.com/Video-soutien-a-la-democratisation?lang=en
 https://web.archive.org/web/20161214153949/http://www.fasozine.com/elections-des-partenaires-europeens-offrent-du-materiel-a-la-ceni/
 http://www.electionreforms.ge/eng/list/show/826-The-Training-Center-of-the-Central-Election-Commission-of-Georgia-has-shared-its-experience-in-electoral-trainings-at-the-International-Conference-of-the-Association-of-European-Election-Officials-ACEEEO
 http://cesko.ge/eng/static/408/mexute-yovelwliuri-shexvedra-2015

Organisations based in Brussels
Organizations established in 2010